Inferno is a 1953 American drama/thriller starring Robert Ryan, William Lundigan and Rhonda Fleming, directed by Roy Ward Baker. It was shot in Technicolor and shown in 3-D, with stereophonic sound.

Plot
When millionaire industrialist Donald Carson III breaks his leg during a trip through the Mojave Desert, his wife Gerry and her lover mining engineer Joe Duncan tell him they will seek medical aid. They deliberately don't return however, hoping Carson will perish while he is stranded alone in the desert. He vows to survive in order to exact revenge on his adulterous wife and her accomplice, who have flown to Carson's mansion in Los Angeles, while waiting for him to succumb to either desert heat or suicide. Instead he fashions a splint for his leg, enabling him to limp down the rocks where he was left and head through the desert. He successfully digs a well and shoots a deer, making strips of dried meat that will last for days.

Law enforcement officers had hoped to find the missing Carson; but after several unsuccessful attempts, it is decided to call off further search efforts. Joe is getting nervous though and to make sure Carson is dead he flies a small plane over the region and spots the remnants of a fire. Suspecting now that Carson is still alive, Joe and Gerry drive back into the desert to look for him and finish him off if necessary. Joe discovers Carson still limping through the desert and is about to shoot him, when an old prospector called Elby, driving a jalopy, encounters Carson and gives him a ride back to his shack. On returning to his own car, Joe finds that in her haste to leave him Gerry has driven his car over a large rock by accident, which has ruptured the vehicle's oil pan. The damage now makes it impossible for them to drive out of the desert. Joe then sees a pair of binoculars on the car seat and he suddenly realizes that her real intention when she moved the car, was to abandon him as well as her husband. Joe angrily walks away, leaving Gerry to fend for herself alone in the Mojave.

That evening at Elby's shack, the prospector prepares supper for Carson, who confesses to his rescuer that although revenge is what sustained him while lost in the desert, the treachery of his wife and her lover no longer seem important. As Elby goes outside to his well for water, he is knocked out by Joe, who spotted the light coming from his shack. Joe then shoots at Carson but misses. The two men engage in a desperate, brutal fistfight inside the shack. A toppled stove causes the shack to catch fire and with both men barely conscious, Elby comes to just in time to drag Carson to safety while Joe perishes in the blaze. The next day, as Elby drives Carson to the nearest town, they spy Gerry walking alone on a long, remote stretch of desert road. Elby stops his car beside her and Carson calmly tells her that she can either wait for the authorities to find her or ride into town with them. She reluctantly climbs onto the back of the car and the film ends with the car continuing on its way.

Cast
 Robert Ryan as Donald Whitley Carson III
 Rhonda Fleming as Geraldine Carson
 William Lundigan as Joseph Duncan
 Larry Keating as Dave Emory
 Henry Hull as Sam Elby
 Carl Betz as Lt. Mike Platt
 Robert Burton as Sheriff
 Robert Adler as Ken, Ranch Hand
 Harry Carter as Deputy Fred Parks
 Everett Glass as Mason, Carson's Butler
 Adrienne Marden as Emory's Secretary
 Barbara Pepper as Waitress
 Charles Tannen as voice of police radio broadcaster
 Dan White as Lee, Ranch Hand

Production
Inferno is 20th Century Fox's first 3-D film.

Release
The 2-D version of the film was released on October 8, 1953.

Critical response

When the film was released, The New York Times gave the film a positive review and lauded the direction of the picture and the acting, writing,

[A]s fragmentary realism the picture rings true and persuasive. Mr. Ryan's portrayal of the gritty, determined protagonist is, of course, a natural. Miss Fleming, one of Hollywood's coolest, prettiest villainesses, knows how to handle literate dialogue, which, in this case, she shares.

In a positive review, Time Out Film Guide called the film, "A tight and involving essay in suspense which works on the ingenious idea of leaving the audience alone in the desert with an unsympathetic and selfish character," and noted the finer aspects of the 3-D film, writing,

Inferno was one of the best and last movies to be made in 3-D during the boom in the early '50s. Certainly its use of space emphasized the dramatic possibilities of 3-D and reveals, as more than one person has observed, that the device had largely been squandered in other films made at the time.

Film critic Dennis Schwartz liked the film and wrote,

Inferno loses something when not seen in 3-D as intended when released, nevertheless it remains as a taut survival thriller. It makes good use of 3-D, in fact it does it better than most other such gimmicky films ... The desert photography by Lucien Ballard is stunning.

Revival screenings
On February 1, 2013, Inferno was shown in digital 3-D in a double feature with Man in the Dark (1953) in the Noir City Film Festival at the Castro Theater in San Francisco.

Home media
Inferno has been made available on Hulu in anaglyph 3D (not its native format).

Inferno was released as a 3D Blu-ray disc, from an excellent print, first from Panamint in Scotland and later by Twilight Time in the United States.

Remake
Inferno was remade for television in 1973 as Ordeal, with Arthur Hill in the Robert Ryan part and Diana Muldaur and James Stacy as his would-be murderers.

See also
 List of 3D films
Survival film, about the film genre, with a list of related films

References

External links
 
 
 
 
 

1950s American films
1950s English-language films
1950s thriller drama films
1953 films
1953 drama films
1953 3D films
20th Century Fox films
Adultery in films
American 3D films
American survival films
American thriller drama films
Color film noir
Film noir
Films directed by Roy Ward Baker
Films scored by Paul Sawtell
Films set in California
Films set in deserts